Hebburn Argyle Football Club is a youth football club based in Hebburn, Tyne and Wear, England. Historically an adult team, the modern youth club is affiliated with Hebburn Town.

History

Original club
The club was originally established in 1882 as St Aloysius Juniors, named after St Aloysius Church adjacent to their ground. The ground was located on Argyle Street, and the club was renamed shortly after its foundation. In 1888 the club moved to a new ground. They joined the Northern Alliance in 1893, and were league champions in 1896–87. The club moved to the Ellison Ground in 1899, with the opening match attracting 4,000 spectators. They joined the North Eastern League as founding members in 1906, but closed down during World War I. The club had entered the FA Cup on several occasions, but never progressed beyond the qualifying rounds.

Youth club
The current youth football club was established by Trevor Wood in 2012 after a previous incarnation had disbanded in the 1990s.

Notable players

Hebburn Argyle players that went on to play professional football include:

Bob Barnshaw
Pat Burke
Tom Cain
Joe Clark

Billy Cook
Jack English
Peter Mackin

Arthur Metcalf
Alec Milne
Alec Ormiston

Alex Rainnie
Peter Ronald
Billy Silto
Jackie Smith

Honours
Northern Alliance
Champions 1896–97

References

Association football clubs established in 1882
1882 establishments in England
Defunct football clubs in England
Football clubs in Tyne and Wear
Youth football clubs in England
Northern Football Alliance
North Eastern League